Upanayana is a Hindu educational sacrament, one of the traditional saṃskāras or rites of passage that marked the acceptance of a student by a preceptor, such as a guru or acharya, and an individual's initiation into a school in Hinduism. Some traditions consider the ceremony as a spiritual rebirth for the child or future dvija, twice born. It signifies the acquisition of the knowledge of God and the start of a new and disciplined life as a brahmacharya. According to the given community and region, it is also known by numerous terms such as janai or janea, poita/paita, logun/nagun, yagnopavita, bratabandha, bratopanayan, and mekhal. TheUpanayanam ceremony is arguably the most important rite for the Brahmin male, ensuring his rights and responsibilities as a Brahmin and signifying his advent into adulthood.

The tradition is widely discussed in ancient Sanskrit texts of Hinduism and varies regionally. The sacred thread or Yajnopavita (also referred to as Janeu, Jandhyam, Poonal, Munja and JanivaraYonya) has become one of the most important identifiers of the Upanayana ceremony in contemporary times, however this was not always the case. Generally, this ceremony should be performed before the advent of adulthood.

Etymology

Upanayana 
Upanayana literally means "the act of leading to or near, bringing", "introduction (into any science)" or "initiation" (as elucidated by Monier-Williams). Upanayana is formed from the root √ni meaning 'to lead'. Nayana is a noun formed from the root √ni meaning 'leading to'. The prefix upa means 'near'. With the prefix the full literal meaning becomes 'leading near (to)'. The initiation or rite of passage ceremony in which the sacred thread is given symbolizes the child drawn towards a school, towards education, by the guru or teacher.  The student was being taken to the Gods and a disciplined life. As explained by PV Kane, taking (the child) near the acarya (for instruction), or alternately "introducing to studenthood". It is a ceremony in which a teacher accepts and draws a child towards knowledge and initiates the second birth that is of the young mind and spirit.

Variations 
A popular variation is Maunjibandhana, derived from two words munja, a type of grass, and bandhana which means to tie or bind. The munjha grass is tied around the waist. This word was used by Manu. Another variation is vratabandha(na) meaning "binding to an observance". The word janeu is a condensed version of yagyopaveeta. The ceremony is also known as punal kalyanam (meaning auspicious thread ceremony) and Brahmopadesa.

Yajñopavītam 
The sacred thread or upper garment (such as a dupatta or uparane) is also called Yajñopavita, used as an adjective, which is derived from Yajna (sacrifice) and Upavita (worn). The literal meaning would then become "some thing worn on the body for the sacrifice". Along with the Yajñopavita there may be a danda (staff) and mekhala (girdle).

Description

Background 
The earliest form of this samskara, whose name there are no records of, may have been to mark the acceptance of a person into a particular community. Indologically, the ritual is present in the Grhyasūtras and Dharmasūtras and Dharmaśāstra, as well as a couple of times in the Samhitas.

Educational courses or training has been referred to in the Chandogya Upanishad and in the Yājñavalkya Smṛti; Gharpure (1956) writes that during the Smriti period, Upanayana may have attained a permanent fixture if the life of students to be as compared to being optional before. 

In the Atharvaveda, and later in the Sutras period, the word Upanayana meant taking responsibility of a student, the beginning of an education, a students initiation into "studentship" and the acceptance of the student by the teacher. Preceptors could include a Guru, Acharya, Upadhyaya and Rtvik.

Gradually new layers of meaning emerged such as the inclusion of Goddess Savitri or Saraswati, with the teacher becoming the enabler of the connection between this goddess and the student. The meaning was extended to include Vedangas and vows among other things. 

The education of a student was not limited to ritual and philosophical speculations found in the Vedas and the Upanishads. It extended to many arts and crafts, which had their own, similar rites of passages. Aitareya Brahmana, Agamas and Puranas literature of Hinduism describe these as Śilpa Śastras. They extend to all practical aspects of culture, such as the sculptor, the potter, the perfumer, the wheelwright, the painter, the weaver, the architect, the dancer, and the musician. The training of these began from childhood and included studies about dharma, culture, reading, writing, mathematics, geometry, colors, tools, as well as traditions and trade secrets. The rites of passage during apprentice education varied in the respective guilds. Susruta and Charaka developed the initiation ceremony for students of Ayurveda. The Upanayana rite of passage was also important to the teacher, as the student would therefrom begin to live in the gurukula (school).

Upanayana became an elaborate ceremony, that includes rituals involving the family, the child and the teacher. A boy receives during this ceremony a sacred thread called Yajñopaveetam that he wears. The Yajñopavita ceremony announces that the child had entered into formal education. In the modern era, the Upanayana rite of passage is open to anyone at any age. Upanayana follows Vidyāraṃbhaṃ, the previous rite of passage. Vidyāraṃbhaṃ became an intermediary samskara following the evolution in writing and language. Vidyāraṃbhaṃ now marked the beginning of primary education or literacy while Upanayana went on to refer to spiritual education. Upanayana can also take place at the student's home for those who are home-schooled. Ceremonial bhiksha as one of the rituals during Upanayana became important, attaining sizeable proportions. The actual initiation occurred during the recitation of the Gayatri Mantra. The spiritual birth would take place four days after the initial Upanayana rituals. It was then that the last ritual was performed, the Medhajanana. The Samavartanam or convocation ritual marked the end of the course. The Upanayana became a permanent feature around the Upanisadic period. 

Attire includes a danda or staff and a mekhala or girdle.

Age and varna 

In Hindu traditions, a human being is born at least twice—once at physical birth and second at intellectual birth through teacher's care. The first is marked through the Jatakarman rite of passage; the second is marked through Upanayanam or Vidyarambha rites of passage. A sacred thread was given by the teacher during the initiation to school ceremony and was a symbolic reminder to the student of his purpose at school as well as a social marker of the student as someone who was born a second time (dvija, twice born).

Many medieval era texts discuss Upanayana in the context of three of the four varnas (caste, class) — Brahmins, Kshatriyas and Vaishyas.  The ceremony was typically performed at age eight among the Brahmins, at age 11 among the Kshatriyas, and age 12 among Vaishyas. Apastamba Gryha Sutra (verse 1.1.1.27) places a maximum age limit of 24 for the Upanayana ceremony and start of formal education. However, Gautama Gryha Sutra and other ancient texts state that there is no age restriction and anyone of any age can undertake Upanayanam when they initiate their formal studies of the Vedas.

Several texts such as Sushruta Sutrasthana, however, also include the fourth varna, the Shudras, entering schools and the formal education process, stating that the Upanayana rite of passage was open to everyone.

The large variation in age and changes to it over time was to accommodate for the diversity in society and between families.

Vedic period texts such as the Baudhāyana Grihyasutra encouraged the three Varnas of society to undergo the Upanayana.

Gender and women

In some regions, in modern times, some girls undergo Upanayana rite of passage. In ancient and medieval eras, texts such as Harita Dharmasutras, Asvalayana Grhya Sutra and Yama smriti suggest women could begin Vedic studies after Upanayana.

Girls who decided to become a student underwent the Upanayana rite of passage, at the age of 8, and thereafter were called Brahmavadini. They wore a thread or upper garment over their left shoulder. Those girls who chose not to go to a gurukul were called Sadyovadhu (literally, one who marries straight). However, the Sadyovadhu, too, underwent a step during the wedding rituals, where she would complete Upanayana, and thereafter wear her upper garment (saree) over her left shoulder. This interim symbolic Upanayana rite of passage for a girl, before her wedding, is described in multiple texts such as the Gobhila Gryha Sutra (verse 2.1.19) and some Dharmasutras.

Yajñopavītam sacred thread 

The sacred thread or yajnopavita ( yajñopavītam) has become one of the most important parts of contemporary Upanayana ceremonies. There are accordingly a number of rules related to it. The thread is composed of three cotton strands of nine strands each. The strands symbolize different things in their regions. For example, among Tamils, each strand is for each of the three trinity of goddesses Parvati, Lakshmi and Saraswati. According to another tradition, each of the nine threads represented a God, such as Agni, Bhaga and Chandra.

The predecessor to the sacred thread was an upper garment (such as a dupatta or uparane). However as traditions developed the upper garment began to be worn continuously. The usage of a thread grew out of convenience and manageability, becoming more popular than alternatives such as a kusa rope.

The ancient Sanskrit texts offer a diverse view while describing yajñopavītam or upavita. The term upavita was originally meant to be any upper garment, as stated in Apastamba Dharmasutra (verse 2.2.4.22–2.2.4.23) or, if the wearer does not want to wear a top, a thread would suffice. The ancient Indian scholar Haradatta states, "yajñopavītam means a particular mode of wearing the upper garment, and it is not necessary to have the yajñopavīta at all times". 

There is no mention of any rule or custom, states Patrick Olivelle, that "required Brahmins to wear a sacred string at all times", in the Brahmanical literature (Vedic and ancient post-Vedic). Yajñopavītam, textual evidence suggests, is a medieval and modern tradition. However, the term Yajñopavīta appears in ancient Hindu literature, and therein it means a way of wearing the upper garment during a ritual or rites of passage. The custom of wearing a string is a late development in Hinduism, was optional in the medieval era, and the ancient Indian texts do not mention this ritual for any class or for Upanayana.

The Gobhila Gryha Sutra (verse 1.2.1) similarly states in its discussion on Upanayana, that "the student understands the yajnopavita as a cord of threads, or a garment, or a rope of kusa grass", and it is its methods of wearing and the significance that matters. The proper manner of wearing the upper garment or thread, state the ancient texts, is from over the left shoulder and under the right arm. Yajñopavīta contrasts with Pracinavita method of wearing the upper garment, the latter a reverse and mirror image of former, and suggested to signify rituals for elders/ancestors (for example, funeral).

The idea of wearing the upper garment or sacred thread, and its significance, extended to women. This is reflected in the traditional wearing of sari over the left shoulder, during formal occasions and the celebration of rites of passage such as Hindu weddings. It was also the norm if a girl undertakes the Upanayana ceremony and begins her Vedic studies as a Brahmavadini.

The sacred Yajñopavītam is known by many names (varying by region and community), such as Bratabandha, Janivaara,  Jaanva, Jandhyam, Poita, Pūṇūl, Janeu, Lagun, Yajnopavita, Yagyopavit, Yonya and Zunnar.

Scholarly commentary

Doubts about Upanayanam in old texts 
Scholars state that the details and restrictions in the Upanayana ceremony is likely to have been inserted into ancient texts in a more modern era. Hermann Oldenberg, for example, states that Upanayana — the solemn reception of the pupil by the teacher to teach him the Veda — is joined into texts of Vedic texts at places that simply do not make any contextual sense, do not match the style, and are likely to be a corruption of the ancient texts. For example, in Satapatha Brahmana, the Upanayana rite of passage text appears in the middle of a dialogue about Agnihotra; after the Upanayana verse end, sage Saukeya abruptly returns to the Agnihotra and Uddalaka. Oldenberg states that the Upanayana discussion is likely an insertion into the older text.

Kane states in his History of Dharmasastra reviews, as well as other scholars, that there is high likelihood of interpolation, insertion and corruption in dharma sutras and dharma sastra texts on Upanayana-related rite of passage. Patrick Olivelle notes the doubts in postmodern scholarship about the presumed reliability of Manusmriti manuscripts. He writes, "Manusmriti was the first Indian legal text introduced to the western world through the translation of Sir William Jones in 1794". This was based on the Calcutta manuscript with the commentary of Kulluka, which has been assumed to be the reliable vulgate version, and translated repeatedly from Jones in 1794 to Doniger in 1991. The reliability of the Manusmriti manuscript used since colonial times, states Olivelle, is "far from the truth. Indeed, one of the great surprises of my editorial work has been to discover how few of the over fifty manuscripts that I collated actually follow the vulgate in key readings."

Regional variations

Nepal

In Nepal, a ceremony is held which combines choodakarma (tonsure, shave the head) and Upanayana saṃskāra locally known as Bratabandha (Sanskrit brata = promise, bandhan = to be bound).

This Sanskara involves the participation of entire family and a teacher who then accepts the boy as a disciple in the Guru–shishya tradition of Hinduism. Gayatri Mantra marks as an individual's entrance to a school of Hinduism. This ceremony ends after the boy goes for his first alms round to relatives and leave for gurus Ashram. Traditionally these boys were sent to ashrams with the gurus to learn in a gurukul system of education but in modern times this act of the boy doing for first alms round in town and leaving his family for gurus hermitage is done symbolically.

See also

Sikha
Upakarma
Rishi
Tagadhari
Navjote, Zoroastrian initiation ceremony
Kushti, the Zoroastrian sacred thread
Izze-kloth, the Apache Native American sacred cord
Bar and Bat Mitzvah—Initiation ceremonies for men/women in Judaism

Footnotes

References

Works cited
(arranged by year)
 Sacred Books of the East. Oxford University Press. 1879-1910.

Further reading 
 
 
 
 
  via Shodhganga.
 
 
 
  via Shodhganga.
 
 
 
 
 
 
 
Basava and Upanayana
 
 
 

News articles
 

Samskaras
Brahmin culture
Hindu religious clothing
Objects used in Hindu worship
Rites of passage
Hinduism and children